Rain Is Fallin'/Hybrid Dream is the 26th single by Japanese pop group W-inds.

Information
The single was produced by Swedish producer Jakob Oloffson, Magnus Lidehäll from Swedish hip hop crew Afasi & Filthy, and Japanese hip hop producer and artist Bachlogic, among others. W-inds also collaborated with Korean group Big Bang's G-Dragon, helping to launch BigBang's career in Japan. The single was W-inds's second consecutive top 3 single on the Oricon Weekly Single's chart, marking a comeback, and it also hit #1 on the Daily Singles chart. It was also nominated for an award at The 51st Japan Record Awards for Outstanding Work.

Track listing
"Rain Is Fallin'"
"Hybrid Dream"
"Upside Down"
"You Are"

Charts and sales

Oricon sales charts (Japan)

2009 singles
W-inds songs
Pony Canyon singles